Pros Vs. Heroes is a flag football game produced by Motor Media. Pros Vs. Heroes is a fundraising platform created to raise money and awareness for charities.

About 
The game has former NFL, current NFL,  and other professional athletes travel around the country to play in flag football games against police officers, firefighters, armed forces and EMT personnel. The game was created in 2014 and is now expanding to different areas around the United States. Motor Media produces the games to raise money and give back to communities. Since its first game in June 2014, the program has raised money and awareness for several causes.

In the last year, five games have been played in the Pros Vs. Heroes series. The first and second game was played at Toms River North, New Jersey against the Toms River Force and South River Brave. The third game was played in Arizona against the Chandler Police Officers and Fire Department at Westwood High School. Recently, games were played in Seaside Heights, New Jersey during the Jersey Shore Festival where the Pros took on Homeland Security and the Toms River Police Department.

NFL players that have Participated 

 Tim Wright
 Ka'lial Glaud
 Mohamed Sanu		
 Marvin Booker
 Antonio Garay	
 Kevin Dockery	
 Jay Alford	
 Brandon Lloyd	
 Geoff Pope	
 Phillippi Sparks	
 Odessa Turner	
 Robert “R.J.” Cobb	
 Torrance "Tank" Daniels 	 	
 Darian Barnes
 Dan Klecko
 Roman Oben
 Amani Toomer	
 DeMingo Graham
 Brandon Jones
 Mike Teel 
 Lance Briggs	
 Aaron Beasley
 Raheem Brock	
 Kevin Malast
 J'Vonne Parker	
 Brian Leonard	
 Al Singleton	
 Dan Klecko
 Frank Sanders
 Adrian Murrell
 Seth Joyner
 Kwamie Lassister
 Michael Bankston
 Frank Sanders
 Adrian Murrell
 Damian Anderson
 Roy McKinnon
 Bruce Mathison
 David Barrett
 Larry Centers
 Amp Lee
 MarTay Jenkins
 Mark McMillan  
 Robert Tate
 Bruce Mathison
 Mark McMillian
 Sidney Justin
 Chris Jennings
 Mark Collins

AFL players that have participated 

 Dan Garay (New York Dragons)
 Donny Klein (Columbus Destroyers)
 Will Holder (New York Dragons)

LFL players that have participated 

 Tanyka Renee Philadelphia Passion
 Marirose Roach Philadelphia Passion
 Heather Roy Philadelphia Passion	
 Jessica Roy Philadelphia Passion

Track & Field 
 Dan Johnson
 Danielle Lynch

Competitors 
Toms River Police Department |
South River Fire Department |
Chandler Fire Department |
Homeland Security |

Sources 
 Darian Barnes
 Asbury Park Press Coverage for Pros Vs. Heroes
 94.3 The Point Interview
 92.7 WOBM Interview
 NJ.com Entertainment
 New Talk WOBM Radio Photo Coverage of Game
 Fox10 Arizona Mesa Game Interview
 News12 New Jersey Coverage of Pros Vs. Heroes Game at Jersey Shore Festival
 Northern Ocean Habitat For Humanity

References

External links 
 Home page
 Twitter
 Youtube channel

American football organizations
Charities based in New Jersey
Charity fundraisers
Sports charities